is a Japanese actress and voice actress. She is best known for her anime roles in the Pokémon series (as Pikachu), One Piece (as Tony Tony Chopper), Corpse Party (as Sachiko Shinozaki),  Naruto (as Konohamaru Sarutobi), Cookie Run: Kingdom (as Pancake Cookie), Smile PreCure! (as Candy), Uchi no Sanshimai (as Fu), Konjiki no Gash Bell (as Gash), and Persona 5 (as Morgana). She is currently attached to Mausu Promotion. Her pet name is "Iku-chan". She is known for playing both male and female roles, and sometimes plays multiple roles in one production. She is a native of Tokyo, but grew up in Niigata Prefecture.

Biography

Filmography

Television animation

ONA

OVA

Theatrical animation
My Neighbor Totoro (1988) – A Girl
Detective Conan films (1997–) – Mitsuhiko Tsuburaya (except for Detective Conan: The Private Eyes' Requiem) 
Martian Successor Nadesico: The Motion Picture – Prince of Darkness (1998) – Yukina Shiratori
Pokémon films (1998–) – Pikachu
Oh My Goddess! (2000) – Sora Hasegawa
Ojamajo Doremi #: The Movie (2000) – Hana-chan
One Piece films (2002–) – Tony Tony Chopper (except for Giant Mecha Soldier of Karakuri Castle)
Konjiki no Gash Bell!!: 101 Banme no Mamono (2004) – Gash Bell
Konjiki no Gash Bell!! Movie 2: Attack of the Mecha-Vulcan (2005) – Gash Bell
Keroro Gunso the Super Movie 4: Gekishin Dragon Warriors (2009) – Terara
Gothicmade (2012) – Love
Pretty Cure All Stars New Stage: Mirai no Tomodachi (2012) – Candy, Smile Pact
Smile PreCure! The Movie: Big Mismatch in a Picture Book (2012) – Candy, Smile Pact
Pretty Cure All Stars New Stage 2: Kokoro no Tomodachi (2013) – Candy, Smile Pact
Mary and the Witch's Flower (2017) – Tib-cat
Doraemon: Nobita's Chronicle of the Moon Exploration (2019) – Aru
Over the Sky (2020) – Gimon

Video games
Another Eden (Morgana, Nopaew)
Ar tonelico Qoga (Mute)
Battle Stadium D.O.N (Tony Tony Chopper)
Blood Will Tell (Dororo)
Brave Fencer Musashi (Topo, Jam)
Cookie Run: Kingdom (Pancake Cookie)
Corpse Party: Blood Covered Repeated Fear (Sachiko Shinozaki)
Corpse Party: Book of Shadows (Sachiko Shinozaki)
Corpse Party:Blood Drive (Sachiko Shinozaki)
Corpse Party - The Anthology - Sachiko's Game of Love Hysteric Birthday 2U (Sachiko Shinozaki)
Daraku Tenshi - The Fallen Angels (Musuran (Yuiran)
Detective Conan: Tsuioku no Mirajiyu (Mitsuhiko Tsuburaya)
Fire Emblem Awakening (Tiki)
Fire Emblem Heroes (Adult Tiki)
FIST (Ai Momoyama)
Granblue Fantasy (Tony Tony Chopper)
Guardian Heroes (Nicole Neil)
Gulliver Boy (Edison)
Gunbird 2 (Marion)
Gunparade March (Isizu)
Harukanaru Toki no Naka de as Fuji-hime
Harukanaru Toki no Naka de 2 as Fujiwara no Yukari and Misono
Harukanaru Toki no Naka de 3 as Hakuryuu (Child)
Kingdom Hearts II (Vivi Orunitia)
Konjiki no Gash Bell!! series (Gash Bell)
League of Legends (Teemo)
Martian Successor Nadesico (Yukina)
Marvel vs. Capcom series (Hoover)
Mega Man Legends series (Data, Bon Bonne)
Musashi: Samurai Legend (Amestris)
Nora to Toki no Kōbō: Kiri no Mori no Majo (Keke)
Ojamajo Doremi series (Hana-chan)
One Piece series (Tony Tony Chopper)
Onmyoji (Kohaku)
Persona 5 (Morgana)
Pokémon series (Pikachu)
Popolocrois: Narcia's Tears And The Fairy's Flute (Kirara)
Pretty Fighter (Ai Momoyama)
Project X Zone 2 (Tiki)
Rhythm Heaven Fever (Marshal, Reporter)
Rhythm Heaven Megamix (Reporter)
Sdorica (Maria)
Shenmue II (Fangmei)
Shironeko Project (Nanahoshi)
Smile Precure! Let's Go! Märchen World (Candy)
Sonic Shuffle (Lumina, NiGHTS)
Super Smash Bros. series (Pikachu)
Super Smash Bros. Ultimate (Tiki (Japanese voice), Morgana (Japanese voice)) 
Tales of the Abyss (Ion, Sync, Florian)
ToHeart (Rio Hinayama)
Tokimeki Memorial Girl's Side (Mizuki Sudou)
Wild Arms Alter Code: F (Jane Maxwell)

 The Japanese vocal tracks for these characters also appear in the Chinese and Korean versions of the game.

Live-action film
Love & Peace (2015) – Kame (voice)
Detective Pikachu (2019) – Detective Pikachu (voice)
Patalliro! (2019) – (voice)

Drama CD
Ouran High School Host Club (Mitsukuni Haninozuka)
Elemental Gelade (Cisqua)

Dubbing roles

Live-action
The Addams Family (Pugsley Addams (Jimmy Workman))
Election (Tracy Flick (Reese Witherspoon))
Forrest Gump (Forrest Gump Junior (Haley Joel Osment))
Fuller House (Stephanie Tanner (Jodie Sweetin))
How the Grinch Stole Christmas (Cindy Lou Who (speaking voice) (Taylor Momsen))
How to Marry a Millionaire (New Era Movies edition) (Schatze Page (Lauren Bacall))
Interview with the Vampire (2000 TV Tokyo edition) (Claudia (Kirsten Dunst))
Jaws 2 (2022 BS Tokyo edition) (Sean Brody (Marc Gilpin))
Kindergarten Cop (Dominic Palmieri (Christian and Joseph Cousins))
Look Who's Talking Now (Mikey Ubriacco (David Gallagher))
Nanny McPhee and the Big Bang (Vincent Green (Oscar Steer))
Mercury Rising (Simon Lynch (Miko Hughes))
Milk Money (Frank Wheeler)
Multiplicity (Zack Kinney)
One Fine Day (Maggie Taylor (Mae Whitman))
Ramona and Beezus (Ramona Quimby (Joey King))
See Spot Run (James (Angus T. Jones))
The Shining (Danny Torrance (Courtland Mead))
Stuart Little (George Little (Jonathan Lipnicki))
Uptown Girls (Laraine "Ray" Schleine (Dakota Fanning))
West Side Story (1990 TBS edition) (Consuelo (Yvonne Wilder))

Animation
Hotel Transylvania 2 (Dennis)
Hotel Transylvania 3: Summer Vacation (Dennis)
Hotel Transylvania: Transformania (Dennis)
My Little Pony: Friendship is Magic (Apple Bloom)
Moominvalley (Little My)

Others
Sanrio character ("Cinnamoroll") (Chiffon, Milk)

References

External links
 Official agency profile 
 Ikue Ōtani  at Ryu's Seiyuu Info
 
 
 

1965 births
Living people
Japanese video game actresses
Japanese voice actresses
Mausu Promotion voice actors
Pokémon
Voice actresses from Tokyo
20th-century Japanese actresses
21st-century Japanese actresses